Old First Church may refer to:

Old First Church (Huntington, New York), listed on the National Register of Historic Places in Suffolk County, New York
Old First Church (Sandusky, Ohio), listed on the National Register of Historic Places in Erie County, Ohio
First Church of Christ, Congregational (Springfield, Massachusetts), also known as Old First Church, listed on the National Register of Historic Places listings in Springfield, Massachusetts
First Congregational Church of Bennington, also known as the Old First Church